Fernando Fernández may refer to:

Fernando Fernández Martín (born 1943), Spanish politician
Fernando Fernández Sánchez (born 1990), Peruvian chess master
Fernando Fernández (distiller) (1850–1940), founder of the oldest rum manufacturing company in Puerto Rico
Fernando Fernández (Spanish footballer) (born 1979), Spanish footballer
Fernando Fernández de Carrión (died c. 1125), Spanish nobleman
Fernando Fernández de Córdova, 2nd Marquess of Mendigorría (1809–1883), Spanish politician
Fernando Fernández de Ovando, Spanish diplomat and nobleman
Fernando Fernández de Ovando, 1st Count of Torrelaguna and 1st Count of Uceda, Spanish nobleman and grandfather of Diego Fernández de Ovando
Fernando Fernández (actor) (1916–1999), Mexican actor and singer known as "El Crooner de México"
Fernando Fernández (comics) (1940–2010), Spanish comic book artist
Fernando Fernández (Paraguayan footballer) (born 1992), Paraguayan footballer forward
Fernando Fernandez (jockey) (1906–1988), Cuban born, American horse racing jockey

Characters
Fernando Fernandez (Hollyoaks)

See also

Fernando Fernandes (disambiguation)